Conor Michael Armstrong (born 17 December 1980) is an Irish cricketer. He is a left-handed batsman and a right-arm medium-pace bowler.

Having first represented the Ireland cricket team at Under-19 level during the Youth World Cup of 2000, he made his debut for the senior side against the MCC in May 2001. He has since gone onto play for them on 27 occasions, including four first-class matches in the 2005 ICC Intercontinental Cup.

He has not played for the senior team since the final of the 2005 Intercontinental Cup against Kenya at Windhoek in October 2005, but he did represent the Ireland A team in 2006.

External links 
 
 CricketEurope Stats Zone profile

1980 births
Irish cricketers
Living people
Sportspeople from County Louth